Capito is a genus of birds in the family Capitonidae. They are found in humid forests in South America, with a single species extending into eastern Panama. Slightly larger than the members of the genus Eubucco, members of the genus Capito are all sexually dimorphic and thickset, and have stubby pale bills that often are tipped black. With the exception of the somewhat aberrant scarlet-crowned barbet, black, red, orange, yellow and white are the dominating colours in their plumage, and males have at least partially black backs. Typically seen singly or in pairs, they are primarily frugivorous, but also take arthropods.

Species

References
 Schulenberg, T., D. Stotz, D. Lane, J. O'Neill, & T. Parker III. (2007). Birds of Peru. Christopher Helm Publishers. 

 
Bird genera
Taxa named by Louis Jean Pierre Vieillot
Taxonomy articles created by Polbot